Red Planet is a 2000 science fiction action film directed by Antony Hoffman. The film stars Val Kilmer, Carrie-Anne Moss, and Tom Sizemore.

Red Planet was released in the United States on 10 November 2000. The film was a critical and commercial failure and is Hoffman's only feature film to date.

Plot

In 2056, pollution and overpopulation have caused an ecological crisis on Earth. As part of the first stage of terraforming, automated interplanetary missions seeded Mars with atmosphere-producing algae. The crew of Mars-1, consisting of Quinn Burchenal, Bud Chantila, Robby Gallagher, Kate Bowman, pilot Ted Santen, and Chip Pettengill, is dispatched to investigate when the oxygen produced by the algae mysteriously decreases.

A gamma-ray burst damages "Mars-1" upon arrival. Bowman remains on board for repairs, while the others land in search of an automated habitat (HAB 1) to produce food and oxygen. The team's landing craft gets damaged during re-entry and lands in the wrong place. In the aftermath, "AMEE," a military robot programmed to guide them, is lost, and Chantilas sustains a severe injury, prompting the others to abandon him. Santen refuses, but Chantilas informs them that they have limited oxygen left to make it to HAB 1, so the crew departs to allow Chantilas to pass away in peace. Bowman talks to Houston while in orbit around Mars. Houston tells her that "Mars-1" is in a decaying orbit, but there is still hope that the engines can be fixed so they can leave Mars.

The landing party discovers HAB 1 destroyed on Mars, despite the fact that the module was designed and field-tested in Tornado Alley to withstand any storms on Mars. Pettengill and Santen separate from the others to explore, eventually reaching a canyon where they argue about whether or not the mission was a success. Pettengill kills Santen by accident, then returns to Burchenal and Gallagher and informs them that Santen committed suicide. Gallagher opens his helmet, preferring death over asphyxiation, but discovers that Mars' atmosphere is thin but breathable.

The only salvageable material from the habitat is the liquid fuel, which has ruptured and pooled beneath the wreck. With no remaining power in their suits, the astronauts light it on fire with a flare so they can have a bonfire to survive the Martian night's massive temperature drop. AMEE rejoins the crew, and the three astronauts notice that the robot is damaged and attempt to shut it down in order to recover its guidance device. AMEE wounds Burchenal and pursues the others before fleeing, perceiving their actions as a threat. Gallagher informs the others that she has entered military mode and plans to kill them all one by one. She wounded Burchenal rather than killing him because she was trained in the old guerrilla tactic that a wounded man slows the enemy down.

Gallagher builds a makeshift radio from parts of the Mars Rover Pathfinder, through which Bowman instructs them to use a Russian probe's sample-return system to launch themselves into orbit; Bowman tells Gallagher that the probe can hold only two people. The trio seeks refuge from an ice storm inside a cave. Pettengill flees with the radio, devastated by the recent news and terrified of being left behind, only to be killed by AMEE. After the storm passes, Gallagher and Burchenal recover Pettingill's radio from his body and discover that it has become infested with insect-like native Martian life (identified by Burchenal as "nematodes"). The insects are highly flammable, as evidenced by the chain reaction that occurred when a simple cutting torch was used on Pettengill's corpse to free his grip. Later, the two come across a field of algae being eaten by insects, and Burchenal figures out what happened: The Martian insects had lain dormant on their nearly dead world, but when Earth's probes spread algae fields across Mars, it provided them with a massive new food source, resulting in a population explosion. The Martian insects are responsible for the algae's demise, but in the process, they provided Mars with breathable oxygen levels because they produce oxygen as a waste product (explaining why they are so flammable). The insects were also responsible for the habitat module's destruction, as they tore in to get to the food supplies inside.

Burchenal explains to Gallagher that the biochemistry of alien insects' respiratory metabolism is capable of producing oxygen far more efficiently than human science can. Studying the insects' biochemistry is the key to terraforming Mars, and may even lead to discoveries which will allow Earth's polluted atmosphere to be repaired. However, Burchenal is attacked by swarms of the insects when blood drips from an open wound. Rather than be eaten alive, he passes his sample vial of insects to Gallagher before immolating himself and his attackers.

Gallagher arrives at the Russian probe, discovers that there is enough fuel to power the rocket's engine but not enough electrical power to launch the probe, and realizes that AMEE's power core is the only available replacement. Gallagher is able to lure AMEE into a trap and disable her using one of the probe's sample launchers in a final confrontation, then steal her battery. Gallagher launches himself in the probe's sample-return capsule and travels to orbit, where he is recovered and revived by Bowman. With a six-month return trip to Earth, the computer has plenty of time to analyze the insects, and Bowman and Gallagher have enough time to start dating.

Cast
 Val Kilmer as Robby Gallagher, Engineer
 Carrie-Anne Moss as Lieutenant Commander Kate Bowman, Mission Commander
 Tom Sizemore as Dr. Quinn Burchenal, Geneticist
 Benjamin Bratt as Lieutenant Ted Santen, Pilot
 Simon Baker as Dr. Chip Pettengill, Terraforming Specialist
 Terence Stamp as Dr. Bud Chantilas, Chief Science Officer
 Neil Ross as Space Suit (voice) (uncredited)
 Bob Neill as Houston (voice)

Production
The production of the film (which was filmed in Wadi Rum in Southern Jordan and in Outback Australia) was the subject of numerous reports about the bad working relationship between co-stars Tom Sizemore and Val Kilmer. Kilmer's reputation for being "difficult" was already well-established, and although the two stars had been friends, they fell out after Kilmer reportedly became enraged when he discovered that production had paid for Sizemore's exercise machine to be shipped to the set. Kilmer shouted, "I’m making ten million on this; you’re only making two", to which Sizemore responded by throwing a  weight at Kilmer. The two were soon refusing to speak to each other or even come onto the set if the other was present, necessitating the use of body doubles to shoot scenes involving both actors, and their relationship became so bad that one of the producers is said to have asked Sizemore not to hit Kilmer in the face when the big fight finally happened – in the event, Sizemore purposely punched Kilmer in the chest. Sizemore has since described the film as one of his career regrets, but also stated that he and Kilmer have since reconciled.

Release

Box office
Red Planet opened at No. 5 at the North American box office making $8.7 million USD in its opening weekend. The film was a box-office bomb, grossing $33 million worldwide against an estimated budget of $80 million.

Critical response
Red Planet received negative reviews. , the film holds a 14% approval rating on Rotten Tomatoes based on 103 reviews, with an average rating of 3.90/10. The site's consensus states: "While the special effects are impressive, the movie suffers from a lack of energy and interesting characters." On Metacritic the film has a weighted average score of 34% based on reviews from 27 critics, indicating "generally unfavorable reviews". Audiences surveyed by CinemaScore gave the film a grade C on scale of A to F.

Stephen Holden's review in The New York Times was almost entirely negative, calling the film "a leaden, skimpily plotted space-age Outward Bound adventure with vague allegorical aspirations that remain entirely unrealized."

In his review Roger Ebert said it "would have been a great 1950s science fiction film" and that "like in 1950s sci-fi, the story's strong point isn't psychological depth or complex relationships, but brainy scientists trying to think their way out of a box that grows smaller every minute."

Music
The music for Red Planet was composed by Graeme Revell, Peter Gabriel, Sting, Kipper, Joe Frank, William Orbit, Rico Conning and Melissa Kaplan with performances from Graeme Revell, Peter Gabriel, Emma Shapplin, Sting, William Orbit, Melissa Kaplan and Different Gear vs. Police.

See also
 List of films set on Mars
 Sojourner (rover) (Real-life Mars rover depicted in film)
 List of films featuring extraterrestrials
 Mars in fiction

References

External links
 
 
 
 
 

2000 films
2000s disaster films
2000 science fiction action films
2000s science fiction thriller films
American disaster films
American robot films
American science fiction action films
American science fiction thriller films
American space adventure films
American survival films
Australian science fiction action films
Australian science fiction thriller films
Films scored by Graeme Revell
Films about death
Films about astronauts
Films set in 2056
Films set in deserts
Films shot in Jordan
Films shot in South Australia
Mars in film
Overpopulation fiction
Village Roadshow Pictures films
Warner Bros. films
2000s survival films
2000 directorial debut films
2000s English-language films
2000s American films